Voyage into the Unknown is a game released by Mastertronic for the ZX Spectrum in 1984 written by Tim Steel from Amoeba Software.

Reception
CRASH gave its second lowest review score of 1984 to Voyage into the Unknown, with only Kosmik Pirate scoring lower.

References

External links

Crash review

1984 video games
Europe-exclusive video games
Mastertronic games
Video games developed in the United Kingdom
ZX Spectrum games
ZX Spectrum-only games